Willington railway station serves the village of Willington in Derbyshire, England.

The station was renamed Repton and Willington in 1855 with a notice on the platform: "Alight here for Repton School".
It closed for goods in 1964 and for passengers in 1968.

The present station was opened in 1994.
It is planned that both platforms will be extended by up to 16 metres by no later than 2012.

Services
All services are operated by CrossCountry. East Midlands Railway operate the station but none of their trains call here. The present station was constructed in 1994. It was planned as part of the Ivanhoe line which would run through to Loughborough, but  this has still not been realised. 

East Midlands Trains used to run a couple of semi-fast services from Burton upon Trent to London St Pancras. The last London service to call at Willington was on Saturday 13 September 2008. Passengers for London must now change at Birmingham New Street for Avanti West Coast services to London Euston, at Tamworth for London North Western Railway services to Euston or at Derby for the original East Midlands Railway services to London St Pancras.

Services operate several times each day in each direction, running a primarily structured two-hourly service from around 8am to around 6pm. From 6pm, services operate three-hourly (one around 9pm and one around 11/12). There is an hourly service each way during the morning peak.

Willington is not served on Sundays.

Peartree is between Willington and Derby, but no trains from Willington stop at Peartree.

History
The station opened on 26 May 1995 at a cost of £565,000 which was funded by Derbyshire County Council with a contribution from South Derbyshire District Council. The station, which is near to a facility for Toyota, was intended to be part of the Loughborough-Burton-Derby line, known as the Ivanhoe line. Unit 150 101 formed the first service from the station.

References

External links

Railway stations in Derbyshire
DfT Category F2 stations
Former Midland Railway stations
Railway stations in Great Britain opened in 1839
Railway stations in Great Britain closed in 1968
Railway stations in Great Britain opened in 1994
Railway stations served by CrossCountry
Beeching closures in England
Reopened railway stations in Great Britain
Railway stations in Great Britain not served by their managing company